Nardiello is a surname. Notable people with the surname include:

 Daniel Nardiello (born 1982), Welsh footballer
 Donato Nardiello (born 1957), Welsh footballer, father of Daniel and brother of Gerry
 Gerry Nardiello (born 1966), English footballer
 Vincenzo Nardiello (born 1966), Italian boxer